This is a list of films which have placed number one at the weekend box office in Italy during 2010.

References

 

2010
Italy
2010 in Italian cinema